Boiruna is a genus of snakes of the subfamily Dipsadinae.

Species
 Boiruna maculata (Boulenger, 1896)- Mussurana
 Boiruna sertaneja Zaher, 1996

References

Mussuranas
Snake genera
Boiruna